Joseph M. Grieco is professor of political science at Duke University, in Durham, North Carolina. Within international relations theory he is a neorealist and is a key figure in the debate between neorealists and neoliberals.

References

Political realists
Academic staff of the Università Cattolica del Sacro Cuore
Living people
Year of birth missing (living people)